The 348th Tactical Airlift Squadron is an inactive United States Air Force squadron that was last assigned to the 516th Tactical Airlift Wing at Dyess Air Force Base, Texas where it was inactivated in June 1972.

The squadron was first activated as the 348th Troop Carrier Squadron in the Air Force Reserve in 1949 and trained at Memphis Municipal Airport, Tennessee.  In 1951 it was called to active duty for the Korean War.  Shortly after being called up its personnel were transferred to other units of the 516th Troop Carrier Group and it was inactivated.

The squadron was again activated as the 348th Tactical Airlift Squadron and activated at Dyess Air Force Base, flying the Lockheed C-130 Hercules.  The squadron frequently deployed to Europe and the Pacific until it was inactivated in 1972.

History

Reserve training and Korean War callup
The squadron was activated in the reserves in 1949 and assigned to the 516th Troop Carrier Group.  The squadron trained under the supervision of the 2584th Air Force Reserve Training Center at Memphis Municipal Airport, Tennessee until April 1951.  The 348th was called to active duty that month and its personnel used to round out other squadrons of the 516th and it was inactivated on 23 April 1951.

Airlift in the United States
The squadron was reactivated at Dyess Air Force Base, Texas in 1968 as a Lockheed C-130 Hercules unit. The squadron trained to airlift troops, equipment and supplies into combat zones, to resupply forces, and evacuate casualties.    Until it was inactivated in 1972, the squadron frequently deployed to Europe and the Pacific.

Lineage
 Constituted as the 348th Troop Carrier Squadron, Medium on 10 May 1949
 Activated in the reserve on 26 June 1949
 Ordered to active service on 16 April 1951
 Inactivated on 26 April 1951
 Redesignated 348th Tactical Airlift Squadron on 1 July 1958 and activated (not organized)
 Organized on 5 July 1968
 Inactivated on 1 June 1972

Assignments
 516th Troop Carrier Group, 26 June 1949 – 16 April 1951
 516th Troop Carrier Wing, 5 July 1968 – 1 June 1972 (attached to unknown October 1968 – June 1969, 513th Tactical Airlift Wing, September 1969 – November 1969, February 1970 –  March 1970, May 1970 – July 1970, January 1971 – March 1971, 322d Tactical Airlift Wing, October 1971 – December 1971, 513th Tactical Airlift Wing, May 1972 – June 1972)

Stations
 Memphis Municipal Airport, Tennessee, 26 June 1949 – 16 January 1953
 Dyess Air Force Base, Texas, 5 July 1968 – 1 June 1972

Aircraft
 Curtiss C-46 Commando, 1949–1951
 Lockheed C-130 Hercules, 1968–1972

Awards and campaigns

See also
 List of United States Air Force airlift squadrons
 List of Lockheed C-130 Hercules operators

References

Notes

Bibliography
 
 
 AF Pamphlet 900-2, Unit Decorations, Awards and Campaign Participation Credits Department of the Air Force, Washington, DC, 15 June 1971
 AF Pamphlet 900-2, Unit Decorations, Awards and Campaign Participation Credits, Vol II Department of the Air Force, Washington, DC, 30 September 1976

Further reading

External links
 

Military units and formations established in 1949
Airlift squadrons of the United States Air Force
Military units and formations of the United States Air Force Reserves
Military units and formations of the United States in the Cold War